Tipulamima pyrosoma is a moth of the family Sesiidae. It is known from Uganda.

References

Endemic fauna of Uganda
Sesiidae
Moths described in 1919
Moths of Africa